

Guinness Premiership

Season: 2009/2010

If teams are level at any stage, tiebreakers are applied in the following order:
 Number of matches won
 Difference between points for and against
 Total number of points for
 Aggregate number of points scored in matches between tied teams
 Number of matches won excluding the first match, then the second and so on until the tie is settled
(C)-Champions
(Q)-Qualified for home play-off.
(q)-Qualified for away play-off.
(F)-Losing Finalists
(R)-Relegated to Championship

RFU Championship

Season: 2009/2010

National League 1

National League 2

National League 2 North

National League 2 South

References

 
England 0
2009–10 in English rugby union leagues